Sebastian Ramhorn (born 3 May 1996) is a Swedish footballer who plays as a defender.

Career
Ramhorn grew up in Malmö where he started out playing for Oxie IF before moving to Real Malmö in his early teens. In the summer of 2012 Sebastian and his twin brother Johan Ramhorn went to trial with Allsvenskan club Kalmar FF and both ended up being signed.

International career
In September 2013 Ramhorn was selected to the Sweden national under-17 football team that would compete in the 2013 FIFA U-17 World Cup.

Honours
Sweden U17
 FIFA U-17 World Cup Third place: 2013

References

External links

Eliteprospects profile
Kalmar FF profile

1996 births
Association football defenders
Swedish footballers
Kalmar FF players
Åtvidabergs FF players
Allsvenskan players
Superettan players
Sweden youth international footballers
Swedish people of South Korean descent
Twin sportspeople
Swedish twins
Living people
Footballers from Malmö